"Transportin'" is a song recorded by American rapper Kodak Black. It was released on August 18, 2017, via Atlantic Records and WEA. Produced by C-ClipBeatz, the song was included on Black's fifth mixtape Project Baby 2 with songwriting credits from Black, Jermaine Smith and Isaac Hayes.

Background 
The song samples Isaac Hayes' "Hung Up on My Baby".

Music video 
The music video was filmed and directed by Sniper gang film
, with personnel including YungMik3 (also known as 20K), Wavylord and Kodak Black. It shows Black in scenes at his house and studio, moving around in a racing jacket with a black and orange bulletproof vest, as Lamborghini and Audi vehicles are featured. Rap-Up notes that in the video Black "counts his money, plays on his iPad, and answers text messages, before heading outside." The video proceeds as Black's orange vehicles were shown on display outside of his driveway.

Personnel 

 Dieuson Octave — primary artist, songwriter
 Jermaine Smith — songwriter
 Isaac Hayes — songwriter
 C-Clip Beatz — producer

Charts

Weekly charts

Year-end charts

Certifications

References

Notes

Sources

2017 songs
Kodak Black songs
Atlantic Records singles
Hip hop songs
Songs written by Kodak Black
Songs written by Isaac Hayes